Odessa Kino are a chain of multiplex cinemas based in Ukraine.

Origins
The first cinema in the chain was the Rodina Cinema in Odesa, which was established in 1999. Cinemas in other cities and towns were then added to the newly formed group over the next few years.

Locations
Odessa Cinemas currently have 6 cinema complexes throughout Ukraine:

 Odesa
Moskva (1 screen)
Rodina (2 screens)
 Dnipro Kinostancia (4 screens)
 Kryvyi Rih Union (4 screens)
 Kyiv
Karavan (4 screens)
Ukraina (4 screens)

References

Cinema chains in Ukraine
Mass media companies of Ukraine
Ukrainian companies established in 1999
Entertainment companies established in 1999